The 1997 Bayern Rundfahrt was the 18th edition of the Bayern Rundfahrt cycle race and was held on 27 May to 1 June 1997. The race started in Marktoberdorf and finished in Pfarrkirchen. The race was won by Christian Henn.

General classification

References

Bayern-Rundfahrt
1997 in German sport